The Tortricinae are the nominate subfamily of tortrix moths. Commonly referred to as leafrollers, as the larvae build shelters by folding or rolling leaves of the food plant,  the tortricinae include several notable pests as well species used as biological control agents against invasive weeds.

Genera incertae sedis
These tortricine genera have not been assigned to a tribe yet:

 Apateta
 Apinoglossa
 Arotrophora
 Camadeniana
 Deltisosciaria
 Hydaranthes
 Ioditis
 Matronula
 Paracomotis
 Paraphyas
 Parastranga
 Peraglyphis
 Syllomatia
 Symphygas
 Tanychaeta

Former genera
Alytopistis (synonym of Ardiosteres)

Life cycle

References

External links
 Markku Savela's Lepidoptera and some other life forms: Preliminary systematic list. Version of 2005-SEP-14. Retrieved 2007-MAY-29.
 Tortricid.net Todd M. Gilligan's Website. Retrieved 30 Jun 2010.